Salcia Venecia Slack (born 10 December 1989) is a Jamaican athlete who specialises in the heptathlon. She represented her country at the 2015 World Championships in Beijing without finishing the competition. Her biggest success to date is the fifth place at the 2014 Commonwealth Games.

Her personal bests in the combined events are 6141 points in the heptathlon (Tucson 2015) and 4181 points in the pentathlon (Birmingham, AL 2015).

She has a son, Bendray.

Competition record

Personal bests
Outdoor
200 metres – 23.92 (0.0 m/s) (Tucson 2015)
800 metres – 2:14.34 (Tucson 2015)
100 metres hurdles – 13.68 (0.0 m/s) (Tucson 2015)
High jump – 1.68 (Alamosa 2014)
Long jump – 6.32(+0.4 m/s) (Grand Valley 2015)
Triple jump – 13.22 (+1.4 m/s) (Albuquerque 2015)
Shot put – 14.99 (Tucson 2015)
Javelin throw – 44.87 (Alamosa 2014)
Heptathlon – 6141 (Tucson 2015)
400m hurdles - 58.24 (Grand Valley 2015)
Indoor
800 metres – 2:15.73 (Pittsburgh University 2016)
60 metres hurdles – 8.37 (Birmingham 2015)
High jump – 1.69 (Chadron 2016)
Long jump – 6.21 (Gunnison 2016)
Shot put – 14.00 (Golden 2015)
Pentathlon – 4181 (Birmingham 2015)

References

External links
 

1989 births
Living people
Jamaican heptathletes
Jamaican sportswomen
World Athletics Championships athletes for Jamaica
People from Saint James Parish, Jamaica
Athletes (track and field) at the 2014 Commonwealth Games
Commonwealth Games competitors for Jamaica
Competitors at the 2015 Summer Universiade